The fifth season of the American competitive reality television series MasterChef Junior premiered on Fox on February 9, 2017 and concluded on May 18, 2017. The season is hosted by regular judges Gordon Ramsay and Christina Tosi, accompanied by a rotating series of guest judges.

The winner was Jasmine Stewart, an 11-year-old from Milton, Georgia, with Justise Mayberry from Sugar Hill, Georgia being the runner-up. This marks the first time a contestant who was eliminated has ever won the competition.

Top 20

Elimination table

 (WINNER) This cook won the competition.
 (RUNNER-UP) This cook finished in second place.
 (WIN) The cook won an individual challenge (Mystery Box Challenge, Elimination Test, or Skills Challenge).
 (WIN) The cook was on the winning team in the Team Challenge and directly advanced to the next round.
 (HIGH) The cook was one of the top entries in the individual challenge but didn't win.
 (IN) The cook was not selected as a top or bottom entry in an individual challenge.
 (IN) The cook was not selected as a top or bottom entry in a Team Challenge.
 (IMM) The cook did not have to compete in that round of the competition and was safe from elimination.
 (IMM) The cook was selected by the Mystery Box Challenge winner and didn't have to compete in the Elimination Test.
 (RET) The cook won the Reinstation Challenge and returned to the competition.
 (LOW) The cook was one of the bottom entries in an individual challenge or Pressure Test and advanced.
 (LOW) The cook was one of the bottom entries in a Team Challenge, and advanced.
 (PT) The cook was on the losing team in the Team Challenge, competed in the Pressure Test, and advanced.
 (ELIM) The cook was eliminated.

Guest judges 
 Aarón Sanchez (episodes 3 and 10)
 Mayim Bialik (episode 4)
 Julie Bowen (episode 6)
 Richard Blais (episodes 7 and 8)
 Edward Lee (episode 11)
 Wolfgang Puck and Martha Stewart (episode 15)

Main guest appearances 
 Michelle Obama (episode 6)
 Muppets Miss Piggy and Swedish Chef (episode 12)

Episodes

References

2017 American television seasons
Season 5